The 1936 Princeton Tigers football team was an American football team that represented Princeton University as an independent during the 1936 college football season. In its fifth season under head coach Fritz Crisler, the team compiled a 4–2–2 record and outscored opponents by a total of 145 to 80. The team played its home games at Palmer Stadium in Princeton, New Jersey.

Bill Montgomery was the team captain. Three Princeton players were selected by the Associated Press (AP) to the 1936 All-Eastern college football team: Charles Toll at tackle (AP-1); Ken Sandbach at quarterback (AP-2); and Bill Montgomery at guard (AP-2). Toll was also selected by the AP as a second-team player on the 1936 All-America college football team.

Schedule

References

Princeton
Princeton Tigers football seasons
Princeton Tigers football